Aleksey Shpilevsky (born 17 February 1988) is a Belarusian football coach, who manages Aris Limassol.

Youth career
Shpilevsky is a son of Belarusian football agent Nikolay Shpilevsky. He played as a defensive midfielder for youth teams of VfB Stuttgart and represented Belarus at 2005 UEFA European Under-17 Football Championship. In 2006, he had to end his playing career due to a serious back injury.

Coaching career
After retirement Shpilevsky started working as a coach for young players in Germany. From 2013 until 2018 he worked as a coach in the RB Leipzig youth system.

In June 2018 Shpilevsky joined Belarusian side Dinamo Brest as a head coach, and in August he left the club, after some misunderstandings with the club bosses.

In November 2018 Shpilevsky was presented as a new head coach of FC Kairat, making him the youngest head coach ever in Kazakhstan. 

On 7 June 2021, Shpilevsky left Kairat to become the new head coach of FC Erzgebirge Aue. He was sacked after seven matchdays, after recording three points, on 19 September 2021.

In February 2022, Shpilevsky joined Cypriot club Aris Limassol as their new head coach. He led them to a 4th place finish in the league, tied for the club's highest ever placement.

Managerial statistics

References

External links

1988 births
Living people
Footballers from Minsk
Belarusian footballers
VfB Stuttgart II players
Association football defenders
Belarusian football managers
FC Dynamo Brest managers
FC Kairat managers
FC Erzgebirge Aue managers
Aris Limassol FC managers
Belarusian expatriate football managers
Belarusian expatriate sportspeople in Germany
Expatriate football managers in Germany
Belarusian expatriate sportspeople in Kazakhstan
Expatriate football managers in Kazakhstan
Expatriate football managers in Cyprus
2. Bundesliga managers